Big Brother Brasil 4 was the fourth season of Big Brother Brasil which premiered January 13, 2004 with the season finale airing April 6, 2004 on the Rede Globo television network.

The show was produced by Endemol Globo and presented by news reporter Pedro Bial and directed by Jose Bonifacio Brasil de Oliveira. The prize award was R$500.000 without tax allowances.

The winner was 21-year-old nanny Gecilda "Cida" dos Santos from Mangaratiba, Rio de Janeiro.
She was the first woman to win the show in Brazil and the youngest winner ever.

Solange from this season was considered for production to return as a veteran in Big Brother Brasil 13, but unfortunately did not return.

Overview
There were fourteen housemates competing for the grand prize. The season lasted 85 days, an increase of one week over the previous season. Housemates Marcela and Solange were involved in what is considered until today the worst fight in all seasons.

Reunion Show
The reunion was hosted by Pedro Bial and aired on April 11, 2004. All the former housemates, attended. Cristiano ended up winning the "Big Boss Prize" which awarded a new Fiat Stilo. He won over Marcela with 70% of the fans' vote.

After the Show
Edílson Buba died in 2006 due to a stomach cancer. Juliana Lopes starred in a Rede Record's prime-time soap opera in 2007 entitled "Vidas Opostas".

Housemates
(ages stated at time of contest)

Future Appearances

In 2010, Marcelo Dourado returned to compete in Big Brother Brasil 10, where he won the competition.

In 2021, Zulu Gomes appeared in No Limite 5, he finished the competition in 4th place. Also, Antonela Avellaneda appeared in Ilha Record, she finished in 8th place in the competition.

Voting history

Notes
 : Géris, Juliana and Zulu received the most nominations with 2 each. Marcelo, as Head of Household, had the casting vote and chose Géris to be the second nominee.
 : Cida and Juliana received the most nominations with 2 each. Solange, as Head of Household, had the casting vote and chose Juliana to be the second nominee.
 : Thiago won the Head of Household and nominated Juliana for eviction. Since Cida and Solange's votes would cancel each other out, only Juliana was eligible to nominate. She chose Solange to be the second nominee.
 : Thiago won the final Head of Household competition. Therefore, Cida and Juliana were automatically nominated for eviction by default.

References

External links
 Big Brother Brasil 4
 Terra: BBB4

2004 Brazilian television seasons
04